TABIC Record Label is a social enterprise that gives young people the opportunity to hone their talent and develop into world class artistes. It was founded in 2018 and by Pascal Atuma who is a Canadian-Nigerian actor, screenwriter, film producer and director.

History 
In 2017, during the Oturkpo Got Talent competition which was organized by David Mark Foundation, Atuma discovered two young acts AOD and Amani Boss which he signed on 2018 into the label.

References

Record labels
2018 establishments